Eros International is an Indian entertainment company, established by Arjan Lulla in 1977, that distributes and produces motion pictures. It is headquartered in Mumbai. Being one of leading film production and distribution companies in India, it co-produces or acquires Indian language films and distributes them internationally by its parent Eros International plc.

Eros International focuses on international markets and has aggregated rights to over 3,000 films in its library, including recent and classic titles that span different genres, budgets and languages. Eros' portfolio of films over the last three completed fiscal years comprised 197 films. In fiscal 2016, the company released 63 films in total either in India, overseas or both. These comprised 33 Hindi films, 19 Tamil films and 11 regional-language films.
Eros International win over 60 Awards at 2015 Film Awards. For its most popular releases including Bajirao Mastani, Bajrangi Bhaijaan, Badlapur and Bela Seshe, Eros International collected 18 awards at the Zee Cine Awards held in Mumbai, India on 21 February 2016.

The highest-grossing movie of Eros International is Bajrangi Bhaijaan, released on 17 July 2015, it grossed 970.05 Crore worldwide. Bajrangi Bhaijaan became the quickest film to collect  and  net. The distributor share of the film had crossed  crore which is a record in India being the second film to do so after PK. In August 2015, Eros International said in a statement to the Bombay Stock Exchange that Bajrangi Bhaijaan has become fastest Bollywood film to gross  worldwide, while it crossed  nett at the domestic box office.

Indian films produced or distributed
This is the list of films those have been produced or distributed (domestic) or both done by Eros International.

Hindi

Films list

Bengali

Tamil

Telugu
Mahesh Babu has worked in three of the studio's projects in Telugu.

Kannada

Malayalam

Punjabi

Marathi

Assamese

International films produced or distributed

Highest-grossing films
This is a ranking of the highest grossing Indian films produced or distributed by Eros International.

See also
List of film production companies in India

Footnotes

References

External links
 
 Eros International at Bollywood Hungama

Lists of Bollywood films
Lists of films by studio
Indian films by studio